Tongyi could refer to:

Tongyi, Mingin Township, village in Kale District, Sagaing Region, Burma
Tongyi, Nehe, town in Heilongjiang, China
Tongyi, village in Yonglong, Jingshan County, Jingmen, Hubei